The Central Asian Games (CAG) is an international multi-sport event organised by the Central Asian Olympic Committee (CAOC) and held every two years since 1995 among athletes from Central Asian countries and territories of the Olympic Council of Asia (OCA), especially formerly members of the Union of Soviet Socialist Republics.

The Central Asian Games is one of five subregional Games of the Olympic Council of Asia (OCA). The others are the East Asian Youth Games, the South Asian Games, the Southeast Asian Games (or SEA Games), and the West Asian Games.

History
In April 1994, President of the International Olympic Committee Juan Antonio Samaranch visited Tashkent, Uzbekistan. During the meeting, President of Uzbekistan Islam Karimov asked him about the possibility of hosting the Olympic Games in Tashkent, to which the IOC President replied that for this, at the request of the Olympic Charter, serious competitions, at least regional ones, should be held. After this, a meeting of the heads of the National Olympic Committees of Kazakhstan, Uzbekistan, Kyrgyzstan, Turkmenistan and Tajikistan was held in Tashkent, at which a decision was made to organize the Central Asian Games.

Despite the fact that the games should be held every two years, for various reasons they have been canceled more than once, and after 2005 have not actually been held. The Games may be revived for 2021 after National Olympic Committee Chairs from the respective countries met in Kazakhstan in February 2020.

Participating nations
All seven nations whose National Olympic Committees are recognized by the Central Asian Olympic Committee and one nation whose National Olympic Committee is recognized by the East Asian Olympic Committee.

 (Afghanistan National Olympic Committee; AFG)
 (Chinese Taipei Olympic Committee; TPE)1
 (National Olympic Committee of the Islamic Republic of Iran; IRI)
 (National Olympic Committee of the Republic of Kazakhstan; KAZ)
 (National Olympic Committee of the Kyrgyz Republic; KGZ)
 (National Olympic Committee of the Republic of Tajikistan; TJK)
 (National Olympic Committee of Turkmenistan; TKM)
 (National Olympic Committee of the Republic of Uzbekistan; UZB)

1Participated only in 1999, as an invitee.

Editions

Sports
Thirteen sports were presented in Central Asian Games history.

Medal table

See also 

 Events of the OCA (Continental)
 Asian Games
 Asian Winter Games
 Asian Youth Games
 Asian Beach Games
 Asian Indoor and Martial Arts Games

 Events of the OCA (Subregional)
 East Asian Games (now defunct)
 East Asian Youth Games
 South Asian Games
 Southeast Asian Games
 West Asian Games

 Events of the APC (Continental)
 Asian Para Games
 Asian Winter Para Games
 Asian Youth Para Games
 Asian Youth Winter Para Games

 Events of the APC (Subregional)
 ASEAN Para Games

References 

 Bell, Daniel (2003). Encyclopedia of International Games (Pg. 108). McFarland and Company, Inc. Publishers, Jefferson, North Carolina. .

 
Asian international sports competitions
Recurring sporting events established in 1995
Multi-sport events in Asia
Sport in Central Asia